Pigskin Parade is a 1936 American musical comedy film which tells the story of husband-and-wife college football coaches who convince a backwoods player to play for their team so they can go to the big game. It was written by William M. Conselman, Mary Kelly, Nat Perrin, Arthur Sheekman, Harry Tugend and Jack Yellen, and was directed by David Butler.

The cast includes Stuart Erwin (in an Oscar-nominated performance), Jack Haley, Patsy Kelly, Arline Judge, Dixie Dunbar, Johnny Downs, Betty Grable, Tony Martin and Judy Garland in her feature film debut. The film was distributed by 20th Century Fox.

Plot
Due to a misunderstanding, Yale inadvertently invites the small Texas State University to come to Connecticut and play against its football team for a benefit game. Coincidentally, TSU has just hired a new coach, Slug Winters (Jack Haley), who arrives at the college with his wife Bessie (Patsy Kelly) just in time to hear the announcement that the team is to play Yale.

The coach digs in to whip the team into shape, with Bessie's help, she knowing more about football than Slug does. But just before the big game, Bessie causes an accident and the team's quarterback Biff Bentley breaks his leg. All seems hopeless until Slug and Bessie stumble across an Arkansas hillbilly named Amos Dodd, played by Stuart Erwin, who throws a football like no one they have ever seen. They find him tossing melons with his sister, Sairy Dodd (Judy Garland).

The only problem remaining is to figure a way to get the college to enroll the hillbilly so that he can take the place of the injured quarterback. Amos also falls for attractive student Sally Saxon (Arline Judge), bringing out jealousy in her rich suitor Mortimer Higgins (Grady Sutton).

Texas State travels to the game at Yale, which is played in a blizzard. During half-time, The Yacht Club Boys sing their planned entertainment: "We Brought The Texas Sunshine Down With Us". The freezing Yale crowd responds with a barrage of snowballs. Yale is leading 7-6 in the final minutes when Slug accidentally knocks himself unconscious on the sideline. Bessie takes over and sends in a play, which hillbilly Amos runs barefoot for the winning touchdown, To celebrate their victory, everyone sings the "Texas Tornado."

Cast
 Stuart Erwin as Amos Dodd
 Jack Haley as Slug
 Patsy Kelly as Bessie
 Arline Judge as Sally Saxon
 Grady Sutton as Mortimer
 Fred Kohler Jr. as Biff
 Johnny Downs as Chip Carson
 Tony Martin as Tommy
 Dixie Dunbar as Ginger Jones
 Betty Grable as Laura Watson
 Judy Garland as Sairy Dodd
 Si Jenks as Baggage Master
 Yacht Club Boys
 Carol Adams as student (uncredited)
 Lynn Bari as Football Game Spectator (uncredited)
 Muriel Scheck as Dancer (uncredited)

Award nominations

References

External links
 
 
 
 
 Pigskin Parade at New York Times

1936 films
20th Century Fox films
American black-and-white films
1930s English-language films
1936 musical comedy films
American football films
Films set in Texas
Films directed by David Butler
Films produced by Darryl F. Zanuck
Films scored by David Buttolph
American musical comedy films
Yale Bulldogs football
1930s American films
Films about hillbillies